Lundi Mbane (born 10 October 1982) is a South African cricketer. He was included in the Border cricket team squad for the 2015 Africa T20 Cup.

References

External links
 

1982 births
Living people
People from Mdantsane
South African cricketers
Warriors cricketers
Border cricketers
Cricketers from the Eastern Cape